The 2014–15 Monmouth Hawks men's basketball team represented Monmouth University during the 2014–15 NCAA Division I men's basketball season. The Hawks, led by fourth year head coach King Rice, played their home games at the Multipurpose Activity Center. They were members of the Metro Atlantic Athletic Conference. They finished the season 18–15, 13–7 in MAAC play to finish in a tie for third place. They advanced to the semifinals of the MAAC tournament where they lost to Iona.

Roster

Schedule

|-
! colspan="9" style="background:#002245; color:#fff;"| Exhibition

|-
! colspan="9" style="background:#002245; color:#fff;"| Regular season

|-
! colspan="9" style="background:#002245; color:#fff;"|  MAAC tournament

References

Monmouth Hawks men's basketball seasons
Monmouth